Lend Me Your Husband may refer to:
 Lend Me Your Husband (1935 film), a British comedy film
 Lend Me Your Husband (1924 film), an American silent drama film